Dorothy Howell may refer to:

 Dorothy Howell (composer) (1898–1982), English composer and pianist
 Dorothy Howell (screenwriter) (1899–1971), American screenwriter